Gulf Coast State College athletic teams are nicknamed the Commodores and  compete in the Panhandle Conference of the Florida State College Activities Association, a body of the National Junior College Athletic Association Region 8. The current athletic director is Mike Kandler who has been serving in this capacity since 2018.

Championships

The Commodores have won a total of 74 championships. 32 of those belong to the women's basketball team.

Conference Championships

Regional Championships

National Championships

Current Coaches
Mary "Roonie" Scovel coached the Lady Commodores from 1996-2012. When she retired Vernette Skeete became head coach. After the 2013-14 season Skeete took a job offer at Marquette so Roonie returned. She has a historic record of 17 Panhandle Conference Championships, 12 Regional Championships, and 6 National Championships.

Kristian Robertson was hired after Head Coach Kyle Peck stepped down. Robertson, who played at Gulf Coast from 2010-2012, has been the assistant coach for former coach Kyle Peck since 2014. 

Beth Wade is only the second softball coach at Gulf Coast. She prepares for her 3rd season following Susan Painters 892-328 run.

Jay Powell is the 16th coach for the Gulf Coast men's basketball team. He has never won a conference title.

Mike Kandler Coach Kandler has won 2 Panhandle Conference championships (2006, 2010) and has taken the Commodores  to the playoffs five times (2006-2007, 2010, 2014-2015)

References

Athletic Site
Official Site

College sports teams in Florida
Gulf Coast State College
Panama City, Florida